Lieutenant General Richard Wardlaw,  is a senior British Army officer, who currently serves as the Chief of Defence Logistics and Support within Strategic Command.

Career
Wardlaw was first commissioned as a Second Lieutenant (on probation) in 1986, on a Short Service Limited Commission within the Royal Engineers (a scheme that commissioned prospective officers for a gap year before progressing on to university). The subsequent year, he joined the University Officers' Training Corps whilst studying for a Bachelor of Engineering in Production Engineering at the University of Nottingham, commissioning once more as a Second Lieutenant (on probation) in 1988. After attending the Royal Military Academy Sandhurst, he was confirmed as a Second Lieutenant in 1991, returning to the Royal Engineers. After promotion to Lieutenant in 1991, Wardlaw joined the Queen's Gurkha Engineers as a troop commander, serving in Hong Kong and Brunei. Being promoted to captain in 1995, and progressing onto Major and Lieutenant Colonel, Wardlaw continued to serve with the Queen's Gurkha Engineers as a Squadron Second-in-Command, Squadron Commander, and finally as the Commanding Officer of 36 Engineer Regiment and Commandant of the Queen's Gurkha Engineers. Upon promotion to Colonel in 2009 (and later Brigadier), and his transfer to the General Staff, Wardlaw served as the Assistant Director of Manning (Plans and Policy), Chief Engineer of the Allied Rapid Reaction Corps and Director of Plans (Army). Promotion to Major General came in 2015, along with the roles of Chief of Staff of the ARRC and Director of Army Basing and Infrastructure; before Wardlaw was finally appointed as the Chief of Defence Logistics and Support along with promotion to Lieutenant General in 2019.

Wardlaw previously served as the Colonel of the Queen's Gurkha Engineers between 2016 and 2020, and as one of the 12 Colonel Commandants of the Royal Engineers between 2015 and 2020. He currently serves as the Colonel Commandant of the Brigade of Gurkhas, and the Chairman of The Gurkha Welfare Trust both since 2020; along with Chairman of the Royal Engineers Officers' Widows Society, and a Trustee of the Royal Engineer Yacht Club.

Wardlaw was appointed as an Officer of the Order of the British Empire in the 2012 Birthday Honours.

Personal life
Wardlaw is married to Judith and has two daughters.

References

British Army lieutenant generals
Living people
Year of birth missing (living people)
Royal Engineers officers
Alumni of Cranfield University
Alumni of the University of Oxford
Officers of the Order of the British Empire
Alumni of the University of Nottingham